Lexical simplification is a sub-task of text simplification. It can be defined as any lexical substitution task that reduces text complexity.

See also 
Lexical substitution
Text simplification

References 
 Advaith Siddharthan. "Syntactic Simplification and Text Cohesion". In Research on Language and Computation, Volume 4, Issue 1, Jun 2006, Pages 77–109, Springer Science, the Netherlands. 
 Siddhartha Jonnalagadda, Luis Tari, Joerg Hakenberg, Chitta Baral and Graciela Gonzalez. Towards Effective Sentence Simplification for Automatic Processing of Biomedical Text. In Proc. of the NAACL-HLT 2009, Boulder, USA, June.

External links 
 Task
 Description

Computational linguistics
Speech recognition
Natural language processing